Çaylı (also, Chayly) is a village and municipality in the Goygol Rayon of Azerbaijan.  It has a population of 875.

References 

Populated places in Goygol District